NuWatt Energy is a company that specializes in solar energy services and is headquartered in Austin, Texas, and Woburn, Massachusetts. NuWatt Energy markets, manufactures, and installs residential and commercial solar panels in Texas, Massachusetts, California, Vermont, and New Hampshire. NuWatt Energy specializes in turn-key solar electric (photovoltaic) solutions for residential, commercial, and institutional clients in New England.

NuWatt also develops solutions within the solar energy sector. In 2017, NuWatt worked with the town of Lexington, Massachusetts to retrofit a “solar noise barrier.”  The barrier generates 825 megawatt hours (MWh) per year of electricity, and is the first initiative of its kind in the United States.

History 
NuWatt Energy was founded in 2009 by Dr. Aiman Alawa, based on his structural engineering expertise and an examination of the future of global energy. NuWatt enables small businesses to benefit from renewable energy while supporting green jobs.

Innovation
NuWatt has been at the forefront of innovating the rise of solar PV noise barriers (PVNB), which serve both as noise barriers and power generation facilities for local communities and State Departments of Transportation.
It is Privately funded, PVNBs are built using private funds, which ensures expansion without federal or state budget impact. The energy produced is then sold at a discount to DOTs or communities.

See also 
 Efficient energy use
 List of energy storage projects
 Solar power

References 

American companies established in 2009
Energy companies established in 2009
Solar energy companies of the United States
Energy in Massachusetts
Technology companies based in Massachusetts
Companies based in Massachusetts